The General Directorate for External Security (DGSE) is France's foreign intelligence agency, equivalent to the British MI6 and the American CIA, established on 2 April 1982. The DGSE safeguards French national security through intelligence gathering and conducting paramilitary and counterintelligence operations abroad, as well as economic espionage. It is headquartered in the 20th arrondissement of Paris. 

The DGSE operates under the direction of the French Ministry of Armed Forces and works alongside its domestic counterpart, the DGSI (General Directorate for Internal Security). As with most other intelligence agencies, details of its operations and organization are highly classified and not made public.

The DGSE follows a system which it refers to as LEDA. L for loyalty (loyauté), E for expectations (exigence), D for discretion (discrétion) and A for adaptation (adaptabilité). These are essential components of activities related to ethics and the management of intelligence work and in collaboration with agents, authorities and partners.

History

Origins
The DGSE can trace its roots back to 27 November 1943, when a central external intelligence agency, known as the DGSS (Direction générale des services spéciaux), was founded by politician Jacques Soustelle. The name of the agency was changed on 26 October 1944, to DGER (Direction générale des études et recherches). As the organisation was characterised by numerous cases of nepotism, abuses and political feuds, Soustelle was removed from his position as Director.

Former free-fighter André Dewavrin, aka "Colonel Passy", was tasked to reform the DGER; he fired more than 8,300 of the 10,000 full-time intelligence workers Soustelle had hired, and the agency was renamed SDECE (Service de documentation extérieure et de contre-espionnage) on 28 December 1945. The SDECE also brought under one head a variety of separate agencies – some, such as the well-known Deuxième Bureau, aka 2e Bureau, created by the military circa 1871–1873 in the wake of the birth of the French Third Republic. Another was the BRCA (Bureau central de renseignements et d'action), formed during WWII, from July 1940 to November 27, 1943, with André Dewavrin as its head.

On 2 April 1982, the new socialist government of François Mitterrand extensively reformed the SDECE and renamed it DGSE. The SDECE had remained independent until the mid-1960s, when it was discovered to have been involved in the kidnapping and presumed murder of Mehdi Ben Barka, a Moroccan revolutionary living in Paris. Following this scandal, it was announced that the agency was placed under the control of the French Ministry of Defence. In reality, foreign intelligence activities in France have always been supervised by the military since 1871, for political reasons mainly relating to anti-Bonapartism and the rise of Socialism. Exceptions related to telecommunications interception and cyphering and code-breaking, which were also conducted by the police in territorial France, and by the Ministry of Foreign Affairs abroad, and economic and financial intelligence, which were also carried out initially by the Ministry of Foreign Affairs and, from 1915 onwards, by the Ministry of Commerce until the aftermath of WWII, when the SDECE of the Ministry of Defence took over the specialty in partnership with the Ministry for the Economy and Finance.

In 1992, most of the defence responsibilities of the DGSE, no longer relevant to the post-Cold War context, were transferred to the Military Intelligence Directorate (DRM), a new military agency. Combining the skills and knowledge of five military groups, the DRM was created to close the intelligence gaps of the 1991 Gulf War.

Cold War–era rivalries
The SDECE and DGSE have been shaken by numerous scandals. In 1968, for example, Philippe Thyraud de Vosjoli, who had been an important officer in the French intelligence system for 20 years, asserted in published memoirs that the SDECE had been deeply penetrated by the Soviet KGB in the 1950s. He also indicated that there had been periods of intense rivalry between the French and U.S. intelligence systems. In the early 1990s a senior French intelligence officer created another major scandal by revealing that the DGSE had conducted economic intelligence operations against American businessmen in France.

A major scandal for the service in the late Cold War was the sinking of the Rainbow Warrior in 1985. The Rainbow Warrior was sunk by DGSE operatives, unintentionally killing one of the crew. They had set two time-separated explosive charges to encourage evacuation, but photographer Fernando Pereira stayed inside the boat to rescue his expensive cameras and drowned following the second explosion. (See below in this article for more details). The operation was ordered by the French President, François Mitterrand. New Zealand was outraged that its sovereignty was violated by an ally, as was the Netherlands since the killed Greenpeace activist was a Dutch citizen and the ship had Amsterdam as its port of origin.

Political controversies
The agency was conventionally run by French military personnel until 1999, when former diplomat Jean-Claude Cousseran was appointed its head. Cousseran had served as an ambassador to Turkey and Syria, as well as a strategist in the Ministry of Foreign Affairs. Cousseran reorganized the agency to improve the flow of information, following a series of reforms drafted by Bruno Joubert, the agency's director of strategy at that time.

This came during a period when the French government was formed as a cohabitation between left and right parties. Cousseran, linked to the Socialist Party, was therefore obliged to appoint Jean-Pierre Pochon of the Gaullist RPR as head of the Intelligence Directorate. Being conscious of the political nature of the appointment, and wanting to steer around Pochon, Cousseron placed one of his friends in a top job under Pochon. Alain Chouet, a specialist in terrorism, especially Algerian and Iranian networks, took over as chief of the Security Intelligence Service. He had been on post in Damascus at a time when Cousseran was France's ambassador to Syria. Chouet began writing reports to Cousseran that by-passed his immediate superior, Pochon.

Politics eventually took precedence over DGSE's intelligence function. Instead of informing the president's staff of reports directly concerning President Chirac, Cousseran informed only Socialist prime minister Lionel Jospin, who was going to run against Chirac in the 2002 presidential election. Pochon learned of the maneuvers only in March 2002 and informed Chirac's circle of the episode. He then had a furious argument with Cousseran and was informally told he wasn't wanted around the agency anymore. Pochon nonetheless remained Director of Intelligence, though he no longer turned up for work. He remained "ostracized" until the arrival of a new DGSE director, Pierre Brochand, in August 2002.

Organization

Divisions
The DGSE includes the following services:
 Directorate of Administration
 Directorate of Strategy
 Directorate of Intelligence
 Political intelligence service
 Security intelligence service
 Technical Directorate (Responsible for electronic intelligence and devices)
 Directorate of Operations
 Action Division (Responsible for clandestine operations)

Technical Directorate (or COMINT Department)
In partnership with the Direction du renseignement militaire, DRM (Directorate of Military Intelligence) and with considerable support from the Army in particular, and from the Air Force and the Navy to lesser extent, the DGSE is responsible for electronic spying abroad. Historically the Ministry of Defence in general has always been much interested in telecommunications interception. 
In the early 1880s a partnership between the Post Office (also in charge of all national telegraphic communications) and the Army gave birth to an important military telegraphy unit of more than 600 men; it settled in the Fort of the Mont Valérien near Paris. In 1888, the military settled the first service of telecommunications interception and deciphering in the Hôtel des Invalides, Paris—where it is still active today as an independent intelligence agency secretly created in 1959 under the name Groupement Interministériel de Contrôle or GIC (Inter-ministerial Control Group).

In 1910, the military unit of the Mont Valérien grew up with the creation of a wireless telecommunication station, and three years later it transformed into a regiment of about 1000 men. Anecdotally, government domestic Internet tapping and its best specialists are still located in the same area today (in underground facilities in Taverny and surroundings), though unofficially and not only. At about the same time, the Army and the Navy created several "listening stations" in the region of the Mediterranean Sea, and they began to intercept the coded wireless communications of the British and Spanish navies. It was the first joint use of wireless telegraphy and Cryptanalysis in the search for intelligence of military interest.

In the 1970s, the SDECE considerably developed its technical capacities in code-breaking, notably with the acquisition of a supercomputer from Cray.
In the 1980s, the DGSE heavily invested in satellite telecommunications interception, and created several satellite listening stations in France and overseas. The department of this agency responsible for telecommunications interception was anonymously called Direction Technique (Technical Directorate).
But in the early 1990s the DGSE was alarmed by a steady and important decrease of its foreign telecommunication interception and gathering, as telecommunication by submarine cables was supplanting satellites. At that time the DGSE was using Silicon Graphics computers for code-breaking while simultaneously asking Groupe Bull computers to develop French-made supercomputers. Until then, the DGSE had been sheltering its computers and was carrying code-breaking 100 feet underground its headquarters of Boulevard Mortier, lest of foreign electronic spying and possible jamming. But this underground facility quickly became too small and poorly practical. That is why from 1987 to 1990 important works were carried on in the underground of the Taverny Air Base, whose goal was to secretly build a large communication deciphering and computer analysis center then called Centre de Transmission et de Traitement de l'Information, CTTI (Transmission and Information Processing Center). The CTTI was the direct ancestor of the Pôle National de Cryptanalyse et de Décryptement–PNCD (National Branch of Cryptanalysis and Decryption), launched to fit a new policy of intelligence sharing between agencies called Mutualisation du Renseignement (Intelligence Pooling). Once the work was finished, the huge underground of the former Taverny Air base, located in Taverny a few miles northeast of Paris, sheltered the largest Faraday cage in Europe (for protection against leaks of radio electric waves (see also Tempest (codename) for technical explanations) and possible EMP, attacks (see Nuclear electromagnetic pulse for technical explanations), with supercomputers working 24/7 on processing submarine cable telecommunications interception and signal deciphering. The Taverny underground facility also has a sister base located in Mutzig, also settled underground, which officially is sheltering the 44e Régiment de Transmissions, 44e RT (44th Signal Regiment). For today more than ever, signal regiments of the French Army still carries on civilian telecommunication interceptions under the pretense of training and military exercises in electronic warfare in peacetime. The DGSE otherwise enjoys the technical cooperation of the French companies Orange S.A. (which also provides cover activities to the staff of the Technical Directorate of the DGSE), and Alcatel-Lucent for its know-how in optical cable interception.

Allegedly, in 2007–2008 State Councilor Jean-Claude Mallet advised newly elected President Nicolas Sarkozy to invest urgently in submarine cable tapping, and in computer capacities to automatically collect and decipher optical data. This was undertaken in the early 2000s. Mallet planned the installation of a new computer system to break codes. Officially, this enormous foreign intelligence program began in 2008, and it was all set in 2013. Its cost would have amounted 700 million euros, and resulted in a first hiring of about 600 new DGSE employees, all highly skilled specialists in related fields. Since then the DGSE is constantly expending its staff of specialists in cryptanalysis, decryption and signal and computer engineers. For in 2018 about 90% of world trade is no longer going through satellites, but submarine fiber-optic cables drawn between continents. And the Technical Directorate of the DGSE mainly targets intelligence of financial and economic natures.

Remarkably, the DGSE, along with the DRM with which it works closely, have established together a partnership in telecommunication interception with its German counterpart the BND (the Technische Aufklärung, or Technical Directorate of this agency more particularly), and with an important support from the French Army with regard to infrastructures and means and staff. Thanks to its close partnership with the DRM, the DGSE also enjoys the service of the large spy ship French ship Dupuy de Lôme (A759), which entered the service of the French Navy in April 2006. The DGSE and the DRM since long also have a special agreement in intelligence with the United Arab Emirates, thanks to which these agencies share with the German BND a COMINT station located in the Al Dhafra Air Base 101. The DGSE also enjoys a partnership in intelligence activities with the National Intelligence Agency (South Africa).

Today the French intelligence community would rank third in the world behind the American National Security Agency and British GCHQ in capacities of telecommunication interceptions worldwide.

Action Division

The action division (Division Action) is responsible for planning and performing clandestine operations. It also performs other security-related operations such as testing the security of nuclear power plants (as it was revealed in Le Canard Enchaîné in 1990) and military facilities such as the submarine base of the Île Longue, Bretagne. The division's headquarters are located at the fort of Noisy-le-Sec. As the DGSE has a close partnership with the "" of the Army or COS (Special Operations Command), the Action Division selects most of its men from regiments of this military organization, the 1er Régiment de Parachutistes d'Infanterie de Marine, 1er R.P.I.Ma (1st Marine Infantry Parachute Regiment) and the 13e Régiment de Dragons Parachutistes, 13e RDP (13th Parachute Dragoon Regiment) in particular.

Installations

The DGSE headquarters, codenamed CAT (Centre Administratif des Tourelles), are located at 141 Boulevard Mortier in the 20th arrondissement in Paris, approximately 1 km northeast of the Père Lachaise Cemetery. The building is often referred to as La piscine ("the swimming pool") because of the nearby Piscine des Tourelles of the French Swimming Federation.

A project named "Fort 2000" was supposed to allow the DGSE headquarters to be moved to the fort of Noisy-le-Sec, where the Action Division and the Service Technique d'Appui or "STA" (Technical and Support Service) were already stationed. However, the project was often disturbed and interrupted due to lacking funds, which were not granted until the 1994 and 1995 defence budgets. The allowed budget passed from 2 billion francs to one billion, and as the local workers and inhabitants started opposing the project, it was eventually canceled in 1996. The DGSE instead received additional premises located in front of the Piscine des Tourelles, and a new policy called "Privatisation des Services" (Privatization of the Services) was set. Roughly speaking, the Privatization of the Services consists for the DGSE in creating on the French territory numerous private companies of varied sizes, each being used as cover activity for specialized intelligence cells and units. This policy allows to turn round the problem of heavily investing in the building of large and highly secured facilities, and also of public and parliamentary scrutinies. This method is not entirely new however, since in 1945 the DGER, ancestor of the DGSE, owned 123 anonymous buildings, houses and apartments in addition to the military barracks of Boulevard Mortier serving already as headquarters. And this dispersion of premises began very early at the time of the Deuxième Bureau, and more particularly from the 1910s on, when intelligence activities carried on under the responsibility of the military knew a strong and steady rise in France.

Size and importance
 In 2007 the DGSE employed a total of 4,620 agents. In 1999 the DGSE was known for employing a total of 2,700 civilians and 1,300 Officers or Non Commissioned Officers in its service.
 It also benefits from an unknown number of voluntary correspondents (spies), French nationals in a large majority of instances, both in France and abroad who do not appear on the government's list of civil servants. Those for long were referred to with the title of "" (honourable correspondent) or "HC," and since a number of years as "". Whereas the DGSE calls a "" any French and foreign nationals this agency recruits indistinctly as "conscious" and willing or "unconscious or unwilling (i.e. manipulated) spy." While a DGSE's agent trained and sent to spy abroad generally is referred to as "operative" in English-speaking countries, the DGSE internally calls such agent "" (flying agent) by analogy with a butterfly (and not a bird). This agency, however, also colloquially calls "" (swallow) a female operative. And it collectively and indistinctly calls "" (sensors) its contacts, sources, and flying agents.
 The DGSE is directly supervised by the Ministry of Armed Forces.

Budget
The DGSE's budget is entirely official (it is voted upon and accepted by the French parliament). It generally consists of about €500M, in addition to which are added special funds from the Prime Minister (often used in order to finance certain operations of the Action Division). How these special funds are spent has always been kept secret.

Some known yearly budgets include:
 1991: FRF 0.9bn
 1992: FRF 1bn
 1997: FRF 1.36bn
 1998: FRF 1.29bn
 2007: EUR 450 million, plus 36 million in special funds.
 2009: EUR 543.8 million, plus 48.9 million in special funds.

According to Claude Silberzahn, one of its former directors, the agency's budget is divided in the following manner:
 25% for military intelligence
 25% for economic intelligence
 50% for diplomatic intelligence

Directors
 Pierre Marion (17 June 1981 – 10 November 1982)
 Adm. Pierre Lacoste (10 November 1982 – 19 September 1985)
 Gen. René Imbot (20 September 1985 – 1 December 1987)
 Gen. François Mermet (2 December 1987 – 23 March 1989)
 Claude Silberzahn (23 March 1989 – 7 June 1993)
 Jacques Dewatre (7 June 1993 – 19 December 1999)
 Jean-Claude Cousseran (19 December 1999 – 24 July 2002)
 Pierre Brochand (24 July 2002 – 10 October 2008)
 Erard Corbin de Mangoux (10 October 2008 – 10 April 2013)
 Bernard Bajolet (10 April 2013 – 27 April 2017)
 Jean-Pierre Palasset (interim) (27 April 2017 – 26 June 2017)
 Bernard Émié (26 June 2017 – present)

Logo
As of 18 July 2012 the organisation had inaugurated its current logo. The bird of prey represents the sovereignty, operational capacities, international operational nature, and the efficiency of the DGSE. France is depicted as a sanctuary in the logo. The lines depict the networks utilized by the DGSE.

Activities

Range

Various tasks and roles are generally appointed to the DGSE:
Intelligence gathering:
HUMINT, internally called "ROHUM," which stands for Renseignement d'Origine Humaine (Intelligence of Human Origin), is carried on by a large network of agents and under-agents, contacts, and sources who are not directly and officially paid by the DGSE in a large majority of instances and by reason of secrecy, but by varied public services and private companies which are not all necessarily cover-ups by vocation however, and which thus cooperate through particular and unofficial agreements. But many under-agents, contacts and sources act out of patriotism and political/ideological motives, and they are not all aware to help an intelligence agency.
SIGINT, (COMINT/SIGINT/ELINT), internally called "ROEM," which stands for Renseignement d'Origine Electromagnétique (Intelligence of Electromagnetic Origin), is carried on from France and from a network of COMINT stations overseas, each internally called Centre de Renseignement Électronique, CRE (Electronic Intelligence Center). And then two other names are used to name: smaller COMINT/SIGINT territorial or oversea stations, internally called Détachement Avancé de Transmission, CAT (Signal Detachment Overseas); and specifically ELINT and SIGINT stations indifferently located on the French soil and overseas, each called Centre de Télémesure Militaire, CTM (Military Telemetry Center). Since the 1980s, the DGSE focuses much of its efforts and financial expenditures in communications interception (COMINT) abroad, which today (2018) has a reach extending from the east coast of the United States to Japan, with a focus on the Arabian Peninsula between these two opposite areas. In the DGSE in particular, those considerable and very expensive COMINT capacities are under the official responsibility of its Direction Technique, DT, (Technical Directorate). But as these capacities are rapidly growing and passively involve about all other French intelligence agencies (more than 20) in the context of a new policy called Mutualisation du Renseignement (Intelligence pooling between agencies) officially decreed in 2016, the whole of it is called Pôle National de Cryptanalyse et de Décryptement, PNCD (National Branch of Cryptanalysis and Decryption) since the early 2000s at least. Earlier and from 1987 to 1990 on in particular, the PNCD was called Centre de Transmission et de Traitement de l'Information, CTTI (Transmission and Information Processing Center), and its main center is secretly located underground the Taverny Air Base, in the eastern Paris' suburb. Otherwise, the French press nicknamed the French COMINT capacities and network Frenchlon, borrowing to ECHELON, its U.S. equivalent.
Space imagery analysis: integrated in the "ROIM" general mission, standing for Renseignement d'Origine Image (Intelligence of Image Origin).
Special operations, such as missions behind enemy lines, exfiltrations otherwise called extraction, Coup d'état and revolution of palace and counter-revolutions (in African countries in particular since WWII), and sabotages and assassinations (on the French soil as abroad), with the help of the regiments of the Special Operations Command, COS.
Counterintelligence on the French soil is not officially acknowledged by the DGSE, as this is officially part of the general mission of the General Directorate for Internal Security, DGSI, along with counter-terrorism in particular. But in reality, and for several reasons, the DGSE indeed since long is also carrying on counterintelligence missions on the French soil, which it more willingly calls "contre-ingérence" (counter-interference) in this case, and much "offensive counterintelligence" operations abroad. As a matter of fact and for the record, the former name of the DGSE, the SDECE, means Service de Documentation Extérieure et de Contre-Espionnage (External Documentation and Counter-Espionage Service). The particularity of counterintelligence activities in the DGSE is that they are integrated in a more general mission internally called "Mesures actives" (active measures), directly inspired by the Russian Active measures in their principles. That is why offensive counterintelligence (or counter-interference) in the DGSE has multiple and direct connections with the other and different fields of "counter-influence" and influence (i.e. on the French soil as abroad) (see Agent of influence), and also by extension with Agitprop operations (all specialties in intelligence rather called Psychological warfare in English-speaking countries).

Known operations

1970s
 In Operation Barracuda, the DGSE staged a coup d'état against Emperor Jean-Bédel Bokassa in the Central African Republic in September 1979, and installed a pro-French government.
 Between the early 1970s to the late 1980s, the DGSE had effectively planted agents in major U.S. companies, such as Texas Instruments, IBM and Corning. Some of the economic intelligence thus acquired was shared with French corporations, such as the Compagnie des Machines Bull.

1980s
 Working with the DST in the early 1980s, the agency exploited the source "Farewell", revealing the most extensive technological spy network uncovered in Europe and the United States to date. This network had allowed the United States and other European countries to gather significant amounts of information about important technical advances in the Soviet Union without the knowledge of the KGB. However, former DGSE's employee Dominique Poirier contends, in his book he self-published in May 2018, that KGB Lt-Colonel Vladimir Vetrov code-named "Farewell" could not possibly reveal, alone, the names of 250 KGB officers acting abroad undercover, and help identify nearly 100 Soviet spies in varied western countries, at least by reason of the rule of "compartmentalization" or need to know. 
 The DGSE exploited a network called "Nicobar", which facilitated the sale of forty-three Mirage 2000 fighter jets by French defence companies to India for a total of more than US$2 billion, and the acquisition of information about the type of the armour used on Soviet T-72 tanks.
 Operation Satanique, a mission aimed at preventing protests by Greenpeace against French nuclear testing in the Pacific through the sinking of the Rainbow Warrior in Auckland, New Zealand on July 10, 1985. A French navy limpet mine exploded at 11.38pm when many of the crew were asleep, and blew a large hole in the ship's hull. A second limpet mine exploded on the propeller shaft when Fernando Pereira, ships photographer, returned to retrieve his camera equipment, he was trapped in his cabin and drowned. New Zealand Police initiated one of their country's largest investigations and uncovered the plot after they captured two DGSE agents, who pleaded guilty to manslaughter and arson. French relations with New Zealand were sorely strained, as they threatened New Zealand with EEC sanctions in an attempt to secure the agents' release. Australia also attempted to arrest DGSE agents to extradite them. The incident is still widely remembered in New Zealand. The uncovering of the operation resulted in the firing of the head of the DGSE and the resignation of the French Defence Minister.

1990s
 During the Rwandan Civil War, the DGSE had an active role in passing on disinformation, which resurfaced in various forms in French newspapers. The general trend of this disinformation was to present the renewed fighting in 1993 as something completely new (although a regional conflict had been taking place since 1990) and as a straightforward foreign invasion, the rebel RPF being presented merely as Ugandans under a different guise. The disinformation played its role in preparing the ground for increased French involvement during the final stages of the war.
 During 1989–97, DGSE helped many Chinese dissidents who participated in the Tiananmen Square protests of 1989 escape to western countries as a part of Operation Yellowbird.
During the Kosovo War, the DGSE played an active role in providing weapons training for the KLA. According to British wartime intercepts of Serbian military communication, DGSE officers took part in active fighting against Serbian forces. It was even revealed that several DGSE officers had been killed alongside KLA fighters in a Serbian ambush.
 Reports in 2006 have credited DGSE operatives for infiltrating and exposing the inner workings of Afghan training camps during the 1990s. One of the spies employed by the agency later published a work under the pseudonym "Omar Nasiri", uncovering details of his life inside Al-Qaeda.

2000s
 A DGSE general heads the Alliance Base, a joint CTIC set up in Paris in cooperation with the CIA and other intelligence agencies. Alliance Base is known for having been involved in the arrest of Christian Ganczarski.
 In 2003, the DGSE was held responsible for the outcome of Opération 14 juillet, a failed mission to rescue Íngrid Betancourt Pulecio from FARC rebels in Colombia.
 In 2004, the DGSE was credited for liberating two French journalists, Georges Malbrunot and Christian Chesnot, who were held as hostages for 124 days in Iraq.
 DGSE personnel were part of a team that arranged the release on June 12, 2005, of French journalist Florence Aubenas, held hostage for five months in Iraq.
DGSE was said to be involved in the arrest of the two presumed killers of four French tourists in Mauritania in January 2006.
 In 2006, the French newspaper L'Est Républicain acquired an apparently leaked DGSE report to the French president Jacques Chirac claiming that Osama Bin Laden had died in Pakistan on August 23, 2006, after contracting typhoid fever. The report had apparently been based on Saudi Arabian intelligence. These "death" allegations were thereafter denied by the French foreign minister Philippe Douste-Blazy and Saudi authorities, as well as CIA Bin Laden specialist Michael Scheuer.
 In 2007–10, DGSE undertook an extensive operation to track est. 120 Al-Qaeda terrorists in FATA region of Pakistan.
 In June 2009, DGSE uncovered evidence that two registered passengers on board Air France Flight 447, which crashed with the loss of 228 lives in the vicinity of Brazil, were linked to Islamic terrorist groups.

2010s

 November 2010, three operatives from DGSE's Service Operations (SO) (formerly Service 7) botched an operation to burgle the room of China Eastern Airlines' boss Shaoyong Liu at the Crowne Plaza Hotel in Toulouse. Failure of the operation resulted in the suspension of all of SO's activities and the very survival of the unit was called into question. SO only operates on French soil, where it mounts secret HUMINT operations such as searching hotel rooms, opening mail or diplomatic pouches.
 In the year 2010/11, the DGSE has been training agents of Bahrain's National Security, the intelligence service which is trying to subdue the country's Shi'ite opposition protests. Bahrain's Special Security Force also benefits from a French advisor seconded from the Police Nationale who is training the Special Security Force in modern anti-riot techniques.
 March 2011, the DGSE sent several members of the Service Action to support the Libyan rebels. However, most of the agents deployed were from the Direction des Operations' Service Mission. The latter unit gathers intelligence and makes contact with fighting factions in crisis zones.
 In January 2013, Service Action members attempted to rescue one of its agents held hostage. The rescue was a failure as the hostage was killed alongside 2 DGSE operators.
 In 2014, DGSE in a joint operation with AIVD, had successfully infiltrated and planted Hidden cameras in Cyber Operations Center under SVR in Russia.
 In 2017, DGSE concluded that Russia sought to influence France's 2017 presidential elections by generating social media support for the far-right candidate.
 In 2017–19, Action Division assassinated 3 major terrorist leaders of JNIM
 In 2018–19, DGSE in a joint operation with CIA, DGSI, MI6 and FIS, tracked and identified 15 members of the Unit 29155, who were using Chamonix as a 'base camp' to conduct covert operations around Europe.
 In 2020, DGSE along with CIA, had supplied the intelligence to COS, in their operation to kill Abdelmalek Droukdel.

DGSE officers or alleged officers

In popular culture
The DGSE has been referenced in the following media:

 The Bureau (2015–2020), Canal+ series about the lives of DGSE agents.
 In the Marvel Cinematic Universe, the villain character of Georges Batroc (appearing in both Captain America: The Winter Soldier (2014) and The Falcon and the Winter Soldier (2021)) was an agent of the DGSE, Action Division, before being demobilized, although he is of Algerian descent, not French.
 Secret Defense (2008)
 Secret Agents (2004)
 Godzilla (1998) film features Jean Reno as a DGSE agent in a major role.

See also

 General Directorate for Internal Security
 List of intelligence agencies of France
 Bob Denard, a French mercenary

References

External links

 DGSE section of French Ministry of Defence website
 DGSE section of French Ministry of Defence website 
 
  
 DGSE on FAS.org

 
1982 establishments in France
Government agencies established in 1982
French intelligence agencies
Military intelligence agencies
Military of France
Signals intelligence agencies